"America" is the second studio-release single from American artist Deuce and is a politically themed song with a stronger metal influence than some of Deuce's other music. It was released on January 10, 2012, a week earlier than originally planned due to a leak of the full music video in late December 2011. The song is the third track on Deuce's debut album titled Nine Lives.

Track listing
Single

America(n) Pride

Charts

References

2012 singles
2012 songs
Deuce (musician) songs
Political songs